Where There Is No Doctor: A Village Health Care Handbook is a healthcare manual published by Hesperian Health Guides. Based on David Werner's experiences at his Project Piaxtla in western Mexico, it was originally written in 1970 in Spanish as Donde No Hay Doctor. It has since been revised multiple times, sold over one million copies, and been translated into over 100 languages. The book is available for purchase, in either book form or on CD, at Hesperian's bookstore. All chapters can also be downloaded individually free of charge in PDF format.

Its distribution is worldwide. The US Peace Corps has distributed it in The Gambia. In Uzbekistan, a United States Agency for International Development grant enabled a team under Dr. Donald Elsworth and Robert Graves of Central Asian Free Exchange to translate the book into Uzbek.

In 2012 Hesperian Health Guides launched their Digital Commons, and health manuals, including Where There Is No Doctor can now be downloaded in 26 different languages, including Arabic, Filipino, Khmer, Lao, Portuguese, Spanish, and Urdu. The Commons also makes available images from the book, and the Health Materials Workshop enables people to make flyers and posters based upon it. The new Where There Is No Doctor is currently in development as an entirely new book. This project takes on the health demands of the 21st century, with entirely new information on diabetes, cancer, HIV/AIDs, first aid, and various other topics.

Content
The book covers all aspects of people's health ranging from diarrhoea to malaria, bone fractures and ringworm. Special emphasis is placed on hygiene, a healthy diet and vaccinations, and the book explains to readers what they can do themselves and how to prevent, recognise and treat many common sicknesses. It also shows them how to recognise problems they are unable to cope with and need to refer to a health worker. This new revised edition includes information about some additional health problems such as AIDS, dengue fever, complications from abortion, drug addiction and covers in detail both childbirth and family planning.

Reception
In the British Medical Journal, a 1998 review said:

The book was referenced in a 2004 article in The Lancet, entitled "Can we achieve health information for all by 2015?" Underlining the importance of straightforward information in the language of the reader, the authors wrote that: 

In the Journal of the American Medical Association, a 2010 review said,

References

External links 
 Hesperian Health Guides
1977 non-fiction books
1992 non-fiction books
Health and wellness books